The Women's sprint event of the 2015 UCI Track Cycling World Championships was held on 20–21 February 2015.

Results

Qualifying
The qualifying was held at 14:00.

1/16 finals
The 1/16 finals were held at 15:05.

1/8 finals
The 1/8 finals were held at 16:40.

1/8 finals repechage
1/8 finals repechage was held at 18:10.

Quarterfinals
Race 1 was started at 20:00, Race at 21:05.

Race for 5th–8th places
The race for 5th–8th places was held at 22:00.

Semifinals
Race 1 was held at 19:00, Race 2 at 19:30 and Race 3 at 19:50.

Finals
Race 1 was held at 20:45 and Race 2 at 21:20.

References

Women's sprint
UCI Track Cycling World Championships – Women's sprint